Plumapathes is a genus of black coral in the order Antipatharia.

Species
Species included in this genus are:

 Plumapathes fernandezi (Pourtalès, 1874)
 Plumapathes pennacea (Pallas, 1766)

References

Cnidarians of the Atlantic Ocean
Cnidarians of the Indian Ocean
Cnidarians of the Pacific Ocean
Cnidarians of the Caribbean Sea
Taxa named by Peter Simon Pallas
Myriopathidae
Hexacorallia genera